Geum quellyon, commonly called scarlet avens, Chilean avens, Double Bloody Mary, or Grecian rose, is a perennial herb in the family Rosaceae. It is native to the central and southern regions of Chile. G. quellyon has been introduced to other countries including Belgium, Bolivia, and the United Kingdom, where it was first planted in 1826.

Description

Macroscale 
Leaves are compound, with between 3 and 10 pairs of leaflets. G. quellyon grows a thick taproot which smells of cloves when broken due to the presence of aromatic compounds. Flowers vary in colour from yellow-orange to pink-red.

Microscale 
When in metaphase, somatic chromosomes of G. quellyon (and of G. magellanicum, another species of Geum native to Chile) are shorter and fatter than those in other Geum species.

Distribution 
G. quellyon is native to the following regions of Chile: Araucanía, Aysén, Biobío, Los Lagos (including the island of Chiloé), Magallanes, Maule, Metropolitana de Santiago, Ñuble, O’Higgins, Los Ríos, and Valparaíso.

Uses

Medicinal 

G. quellyon has been used in the traditional medicine of the Mapuche people of Chile for tooth neuralgia, gastric inflammation, prostatitis, and to regulate menstruation. A methanolic extract is obtained from its roots.

Observations of a kidney transplant patient showed a pharmacological interaction between G. quellyon and cyclosporine, an immunosuppressant used to prevent transplant rejection.

Horticultural 
Geum quellyon is commonly cultivated as a garden ornamental, and in that context is sometimes called Geum chiloense. G. quellyon grows best in full sun to part shade, in moist but well-drained soil.

Cultivars include:

 Geum 'Blazing Sunset', which produces brick-red double flowers on tall stems from June to September.
Geum 'Lady Stratheden', also known as Geum 'Gold Ball', which produces yellow semi-double flowers. The Royal Horticultural Society has awarded Geum 'Lady Stratheden' the Award of Garden Merit.
Geum 'Mrs J Bradshaw', which produces large semi-double flowers from June to September. It grows to a height and spread of approximately 60 cm. It is often planted in cottage gardens. The Royal Horticultural Society has awarded Geum 'Mrs J Bradshaw' the Award of Garden Merit.
Geum 'Totally Tangerine', which is a hybrid of G. quellyon 'Mrs J Bradshaw' and G. rivale. It is subject to plant breeders' rights in the European Union and the United Kingdom until 31 December 2036.

Diseases 
G. quellyon may be affected by pathogens belonging to the genus Peronospora.

Notes

References

External links
 
 

quellyon
Flora of Chile
Medicinal plants of South America
Garden plants